David Amick Byram (born January 24, 1955) is an American tenor, a recording artist and two-time Grammy nominee.

A native of McLennan County, Texas, Byram is a well-known sessions artist in Los Angeles, California, He was best known for providing the singing voice of Moses in The Prince of Egypt,

Aside from that, he contributed for the films Shrek, Aladdin, Beauty and the Beast, The Lion King, Pocahontas, Hercules, Mulan, Pocahontas II: Journey to a New World, The Road to El Dorado, and The Matrix as part of the Additional Voices.

Byram has acted in numerous professional stage productions including The Phantom of the Opera, on Broadway and in Los Angeles; Les Misérables, as Joly and an understudy for Enjolras; Sunset Boulevard as Joe Gillis (playing opposite Glenn Close), and Jesus in Jesus Christ Superstar. He played Sir Archibald Proops in the 1994 recording of Jekyll & Hyde.

On television he played Ian Andrew Troi, the father of Counselor Troi in Star Trek: The Next Generation, and has appeared in The Simpsons and Quincy, M.E..

He is married to actress and singer Cassandra Byram and is the brother of gospel singer Danny Byram. Byram is the Producing Director and Co-Founder of the American Coast Theater Company.  He is a 1977 graduate of Oral Roberts University, and was named ORU's 2014 Alumnus of the Year.

He has also been active in the Church Ministry, where not only has he written and recorded his own gospel songs, but also has performed in Worship Music Concerts, as well as being guested in Church-related events. 

Around 2015 to 2016, he guested on Hour of Power with Bobby Schuller

References

External links
 
 
Full Biography on Byram's website 

American tenors
American male film actors
American male musical theatre actors
American male television actors
American male stage actors
American male voice actors
Living people
People from McLennan County, Texas
1955 births
Male actors from Texas
Singers from Texas
20th-century American male actors
21st-century American male actors
20th-century American singers
20th-century American male singers
21st-century American male singers
21st-century American singers
American Christians